Sylvan Pass may be one of the following:

Mountain passes
Sylvan Pass (British Columbia) – a pass in British Columbia, Canada
Sylvan Pass (Wyoming) – a pass in Yellowstone National Park, Wyoming, United States